Ringgo Ancheta, better known by his stage name Mndsgn (pronounced "mind design"), is an American record producer and singer-songwriter based in Los Angeles, California.

Biography
Mndsgn was born Ringgo Ancheta in San Diego, California and was raised in New Jersey. He is the youngest of four in a family of Filipino descent. His mother was a nurse and his father was a Navy man. He learned to play organ before his older brother introduced him to rap music and beat production at a pivotal age.

In 2008, platforms like Myspace and AIM messenger connected Mndsgn with beatmakers Knxwledge, Suzi Analogue and devonwho to form Klipm0de. The collective played and released beat tapes through Bandcamp. Ancheta relocated to Los Angeles in 2011 and self-released beat tapes as well as a few projects distributed by labels Leaving and Fresh Selects, and regularly performed at local hubs such as Low End Theory.

In 2013, Mndsgn collaborated with Danny Brown on "Sweeney Song," which appeared on Classic Drug References Vol. 1. His first solo studio album for Stones Throw Records, titled Yawn Zen, was released in 2014. He followed up with Body Wash in 2016, an album that drew heavily on ‘80s R&B and boogie which Vinyl Me, Please cited as one of "The 10 Best Stones Throw Albums To Own On Vinyl", before releasing raw, mixtape-style records Snax and Snaxx in 2018 and 2019, the latter which Clash called "an instant classic" and "everything we’ve come to expect and more, from the San Diego beat maker".

In March 2021, Mndsgn announced his third studio album for Stones Throw Records, Rare Pleasure. Inspired by R&B, soundtrack music, psychedelia and jazz, Rare Pleasure features Kiefer (musician), Swarvy, Carlos Niño, Fousheé, Devin Morrison, Anna Wise and more. Rare Pleasure was released in June 2021 on Stones Throw Records.

In addition to his solo work, Mndsgn co-wrote and produced Prophet’s 2018 album, Wanna Be Your Man, and Peach Fuzz with Tyler, the Creator.

Discography

Studio albums
 Breatharian (2013)
 Yawn Zen (2014)
 Vivians (2015) 
 Body Wash (2017)
 Snax (2018)
 Snaxx (2019)
 Forever in Your Sun (2020) 
 Rare Pleasure (2021)

Compilation albums
 Funraiser Vol. 2: Skrayons (2009)
 Episodes (2010) 
 A Rap Vacation X-Mas (2013) 
 Gonna B OK (2020)

Mixtapes
 Frugal Earth (2013)
 Frugal Earth Vol. Two (2013)

EPs
 3P (2009)
 Lights & Tunnels (2009)
 Statik Mumblin (2011)
 NoMaps (2011)
 Daypass (2011)
 Feels (2012)
 Oblique Kitchn (2012)
 Bed (2013)
 Inedia (2014)
 Surface Outtakes (2014)

Singles
 "Flybutter" (2010)
 "Walter Rand Center of Transportation" (2010)
 "Cold Crush" (2016) 
 "Deviled Eggs" (2019)
 "Sumdim" (2019)
 "Hope You're Doin' Better" (2021)
 "Slowdance" (2021)

Guest appearances
 Devonwho - "Spaghettiisland" from Funraiser Vol. 1: Thumbtracks (2009)
 Sir Froderick - "Dodooonshoe Pt. 7" from Reconnecting! (2011)
 Jonwayne - "Featuring Mndsgn" from Bowser (2011)
 Sir Froderick - "Cilantro" from The Brief Wondrous (2012)
 Swarvy - "Pebbles", "Tooth", and "Sigh" from Trillian (2012)
 Jonwayne - "Neckbrokeblues" from Oodles of Doodles (2012)
 Sir Froderick - "After" from Consolidate (2013)
 Jonwayne - "Sandals" from Rap Album One (2013)
 Johnah Levine Collective - "Zootcase" from Attention Deficit (2017)
 Chai - "In Pink" from Wink (2021)

Productions
 Suzi Analogue - "Son" from World. Excerpts 1–9 (2009)
 Suzi Analogue - "Quarter Inches (Brain Waverlude)" from Nnxtape (2010)
 Danny Brown - "Sweeney Song" from Classic Drug References, Vol. 1 (2013)
 Jonwayne - "Altitude" from Cassette 3: The Marion Morrison Mixtape (2013)
 Ivan Ave - Low Jams (2014)
 Doja Cat - "Nunchucks" from Purrr! (2014)
 Pyramid Vritra - "224" from PV4 (2015)
 Ivan Ave - Helping Hands (2016)
 Asal Hazel - "Usayudo" (2017)
 Ill Camille - "Almost There" from Heirloom (2017)
 Quelle Chris - "Popeye" from Being You Is Great, I Wish I Could Be You More Often (2017)
 Asal Hazel - "UTMT", "Royal Interlude", and "Make Love" from Like Water (2018)
 Prophet - Wanna Be Your Man (2018)
 Tyler, The Creator - "Peach Fuzz" (2018)
 SiR - "War" from November (2018)
 Fatima - "Dang" from And Yet It's All Love (2018)
 M.E.D. and Guilty Simpson - "Pie" from Child of the Jungle (2019)

References

External links
 

Living people
Musicians from San Diego
American people of Filipino descent
American hip hop record producers
American artists
Stones Throw Records artists
Year of birth missing (living people)